Ferdinand Mélin-Soucramanien is a French professor of Law.
 
He was appointed President of the Institut national du service public (INSP) in 2022 by President Emmanuel Macron.

Education and early career 
Born in February 10, 1966 in Aix-en-Provence he studied Literature in Réunion then the Law before becoming a doctor of law at Aix-Marseille University and then a lecturer there. He was also professor of Constitutional law at University of Bordeaux IV.

After a thesis in 1996 about the "Principle of equality in decisions of Constitutional Council" for which he received a prize of Constitutional Council. He received the Agrégation of Law in 1998.

References 

French legal scholars
Living people

1966 births
Academic staff of the University of Bordeaux
Aix-Marseille University alumni